The hybrid elm cultivar Ulmus × hollandica 'Muscaviensis' was listed by Schneider in Illustriertes Handbuch der Laubholzkunde 1:219, 1904 as U. dippeliana f. muscaviensis. The name 'Muscaviensis' refers to its origin in Muskau Arboretum (Arboretum Muscaviense), where Eduard Petzold raised elms in the late 19th century.

Description
The tree was described as being larger than U. glabra viminalis (: Ulmus × viminalis Lodd.), with leaves measuring < 9 cm long by < 5 cm broad.

Cultivation
No specimens are known to survive, but hybrids cultivars of this group, if propagated vegetatively, can persist through sucker regrowth.

Synonymy
Ulmus dippeliana f. muscaviensis: C. K. Schneid., in Illustriertes Handbuch der Laubholzkunde, 1:219, 1904.

References

Dutch elm cultivar
Ulmus articles with images
Ulmus
Missing elm cultivars